Nick Dyer (born 10 September 1969) is a Scottish former cricketer. He is a right-handed batsman and a right-arm offbreak bowler. He played in five One-Day Internationals in May 1999 and participated in List A cricket between 1997 and 1999. Dyer has played cricket for Haverfordwest Cricket Club in the Pembrokeshire Cricket League, helping them win the top Division in Pembrokeshire. He is also an exceptional squash player having played for Wales at Masters level and in the Welsh premier squash league.

References

External links

1969 births
Living people
Scottish cricketers
Scotland One Day International cricketers
Cricketers at the 1998 Commonwealth Games
Cricketers at the 1999 Cricket World Cup
Cricketers from Edinburgh
Commonwealth Games competitors for Scotland